Étienne Hajdú (born István Hajdú; 12 August 1907 – 24 March 1996) was a Hungarian-born French sculptor of Jewish descent. After emigration to Paris in the 1930s, he became part of the Hungarian circle of artists and writers. He fought in the French Resistance during World War II.

Early life and education
Istvan Hadju was born in 1907 to a Jewish family in Torda, Torda-Aranyos County, Transylvania, Kingdom of Hungary (now Turda, Cluj County, Romania).

Career
He emigrated to Paris in the 1930s and became part of the Hungarian artistic circle there.

World War II
After the Fall of France, Hajdu became active in the Résistance movement. Numerous Jewish Hungarians, most of them artists and writers, were part of the Résistance. Many carried out their actions outside Paris, as foreigners had been formally evacuated with the outbreak of war in September 1939.

Death
Hajdú died in Bagneux, Hauts-de-Seine.

External links 
 http://www.absolutearts.com/artsnews/2001/04/18/28419.html
 http://www.artportal.hu/international/espanol?tartalom=484 (Spanish)
 

1907 births
1996 deaths
People from Turda
Hungarian Jews
French people of Hungarian-Jewish descent
Hungarian sculptors
20th-century French sculptors
French male sculptors
Commandeurs of the Ordre des Arts et des Lettres